The Blue Diamond Prelude (Colts and Geldings) is a Melbourne Racing Club Group 3  Thoroughbred horse race raced under set weight conditions, for two-year-old colts and geldings, over a distance of 1100 metres at Caulfield Racecourse in Melbourne, Australia in February. Total prizemoney is A$200,000.

History
The race is a major preparatory race for the rich Blue Diamond Stakes held two weeks later.

Colts that have captured the Blue Diamond Prelude – Blue Diamond Stakes double: 
Rancher (1982), Bel Esprit (2002), Sepoy (2011), Written By (2018)

Distance
 1982–1985 – 1200 metres
 1986–1995 – 1100 metres
 1996 – 1150 metres
 1997 onwards - 1100 metres

Grade
1982–1985 - Listed Race
1986 onwards - Group 3

Venue
 1982–1995 -  Caulfield Racecourse
 1996 - Sandown Racecourse
 1997–2022 -  Caulfield Racecourse
 2023 - Sandown Racecourse

Winners

2022 - Lofty Strike 
2021 - General Beau 
2020 - Hanseatic 
2019 - I Am Immortal
2018 - Written By
2017 - Property
2016 - Flying Artie  
2015 - Of The Brave
2014 - Rubick
2013 - Kuroshio
2012 - General Rippa
2011 - Sepoy
2010 - Beneteau
2009 - Real Saga
2008 - Wilander
2007 - Shrewd Rhythm
2006 - Due Sasso
2005 - Perfectly Ready
2004 - Way West
2003 - Hammerbeam
2002 - Bel Esprit
2001 - Lonhro
2000 - Happy Giggle
1999 - Charm Scene Lad
1998 - Prowl
1997 - Millward
1996 - Winger Charger
1995 - Flying Spur
1994 - Danzero
1993 - Alacqua
1992 - Yachtie
1991 - Chief Headhunter
1990 - Unspoken Word
1989 - Ark Regal
1988 - Nanutarra
1987 - Square Deal
1986 - Western Ace
1985 - Let’s Get Physical
1984 - Slick Draw
1983 - Brave Show
1982 - Rancher

See also
 List of Australian Group races
 Group races

References

Horse races in Australia
Caulfield Racecourse